Amalie Fries (1823–1887) was a stage actor and singer active in Bohemia. 

Her origin is not known. She performed in Bohemia in a travelling theater company from 1839. 

She was engaged at the Estates Theatre in Prague in 1846-1887, where she belonged to the theatre's star attractions. She was known for her roles as a heroine and confidant within comedy and farce. She was described as hard working, dutiful, and beautiful and was a popular actor. 

She was not only an actor but also a singer. She was regarded as a more able singer than an actor and was often engaged to perform as a singer when the theater offered singing roles. Few other actors that the Estates Theatre were engaged for as many years as she.

References

http://encyklopedie.idu.cz/index.php?option=com_content&view=article&id=93:fries-amalie&catid=10&lang=cs&Itemid=108

19th-century Czech actors
1823 births
1887 deaths
Date of birth missing
Date of death missing